St. Leo’s was a U.S. soccer team based in St. Louis, Missouri.  It was founded in 1903 as a member of the St. Louis Association Football League before moving to the St. Louis Soccer League in 1908.  It was one of the first fully professional soccer teams in the U.S. and dominated the St. Louis soccer scene for over a decade.  In 1918, the team came under sponsorship of St. Louis Screw and competed under that name until 1922.

History

Original team
Nicknamed the Blue and White, St. Leo’s was founded by William Klosterman in 1902 as a recreational team for the St. Leo’s Sodality, a Catholic men’s organization.  It competed in the Junior League, winning the league title.  In 1903, St. Leo's moved up to the Amateur League which competed at Christian Brother's College where they again won the league title.  During the 1904-05 season, they competed in a league at Forest Park.  In 1905, they entered the St. Louis Association Foot Ball League where they won three consecutive league titles.  Following its 1908 championship, the AFL merged with the St. Louis Soccer League which had been established the year before.  St. Leo’s quickly asserted its dominance as the only fully professional team in the new league.  It ran off a string of five championships.  By 1910, frustrations at St. Leo’s success began to surface among the league’s other teams.  This led to a movement to make the SLSL and entirely amateur league.  This controversy became so heated during the 1911-1912 season that St. Leo’s withdrew from the league during the end of the season.  Despite not playing several games, it still won the league title.  The team re-entered the SLSL for the 1912-1913 season, but the resentment at its success could no longer be contained and the SLSL split in 1913 into two leagues, the fully professional Federal Park League and the amateur Robison Field League.  St. Leo’s took both Federal Park League titles, but in 1915, they fell to Innisfails 4-2 in the replay of a combined league title game.  The first game had ended in a 2-2 tie.  That summer, the two leagues merged to form a renewed SLSL.  This episode did not serve St. Leo’s long term interests as it brought Ben Millers into the top level of St. Louis soccer.  Ben Millers quickly established themselves as the dominant team and St. Leo’s and Innisfails found themselves fighting for second place.  In 1918, St. Leo’s Catholic Church withdrew its sponsorship from the team and the team gained the sponsorship of St. Louis Screws.

Second team
St. Leo's may have begun sponsoring a new team, as a St. Leo's, from St. Louis, entered the 1922 National Challenge Cup.  As this team was not in the St. Louis Soccer League, it most probably competed in one of the lower division city leagues.

National competition
During the early decades of the twentieth century, U.S. soccer was a largely regional sport.  However, in 1911 the top St. Louis and east coast teams met in a round robin tournament to crown the U.S. soccer champions.  This round robin tournament is barely documented, but from various sources, it seems that on December 29, 1912, St. Leo’s defeated West Hudson A.A. to clinch the title as U.S. soccer champions.

Record

1910 roster
 Outside right: Jimmy Donohue
 Inside right:  William Tallman
 Center forward:  Chuck O'Berta, Richard "Bull" Brannigan
 Inside left:  J. Arthur "Butch" Amnions, Joe Mason
 Outside left:  Dave Miller
 Right half:  Joe Flynn
 Center half:  Gerald Shea, Peterson,
 Left half:  Johnny Miller
 Right full:  Medric Boucher, Hick January
 Left full:  James "Jim" Flynn
 Goalkeeper:  Jack Tully

Coach
 William Klosterman 1902-

External links
 St. Louis Soccer League standings
 History of Soccer in St. Louis
 Photo of Billy Kane – St. Leo’s 1909-1911
 Account of March 1912 exhibition tie with Fall River Rovers.  Includes team line up

References

Association football clubs established in 1903
Defunct soccer clubs in Missouri
Soccer clubs in St. Louis
St. Louis Soccer League teams
1903 establishments in Missouri
1918 disestablishments in Missouri
Association football clubs disestablished in 1918